The Pyongyang University of Foreign Studies is a five-year university in Pyongyang, North Korea, specializing in language education.

History

The university was split off from Kim Il-sung University in 1964. North Korea's state-run Korean Central News Agency gives its foundation date as 15 November 1949. It does not have as high a reputation as those of Kim Il-sung University's foreign languages division, which trains members of the political elite; most graduates go on to become working-level diplomats or work in the intelligence service.

Structure
The university has separate colleges for students of English, Russian, Chinese, and Japanese; the so-called "Ethnic Languages College" offers instruction in a further 18 languages, including French, Spanish, Arabic, Thai, Urdu, Khmer, and, as of July 2007, Polish and Italian.

In total, 22 languages are taught at PUFS:

Chinese, Russian, Japanese, Hungarian, Arabic, Malay, Khmer, Thai, Lao, Persian, Hindi, Urdu, English, German, Bulgarian, Czech, Polish, French, Italian, Portuguese, Romanian, and Spanish.

Notable students, faculty, and alumni

 Charles Robert Jenkins, American defector and former English teacher; his daughters Brinda and Mika formerly attended as students
 James Dresnok, son of American defector James Joseph Dresnok
Ri Yong-ho
Thae Yong-ho, defector from North Korea, formerly North Korea's deputy ambassador to the United Kingdom; current member of the National Assembly in South Korea

See also 
 List of universities in North Korea

References 

 Danahar, Paul. "Meeting North Korea's 'Generation Next'" BBC News. BBC, 13 Feb. 2010. Web. 12 Apr. 2014.

External links 
 Meeting North Korea's 'Generation next': a UK Wired News interview with a British Council ESL teacher at the Pyongyang University of Foreign Studies
 Class Report from North Korea , another interview with a different British Council ESL teacher at the Pyongyang University of Foreign Studies

Educational institutions established in 1964
Education in Pyongyang
Universities in North Korea
1964 establishments in North Korea